The Private War of Lucinda Smith is a 1990 Australian mini series about an Australian chorus girl living in London.

References

External links

The Private War of Lucinda Smith at AustLit

1990s Australian television miniseries
1990 Australian television series debuts
1990 Australian television series endings
Nine Network original programming
English-language television shows